The 1974 Wichita State Shockers football team was an American football team that represented  Wichita State University as a member of the Missouri Valley Conference (MVC) during the 1974 NCAA Division I football season. In their first year under head coach Jim Wright, the team compiled an overall record of 1–9–1 with a mark of 1–4–1 in conference play, finishing in seventh place in the MVC.

Schedule

References

Wichita State
Wichita State Shockers football seasons
Wichita State Shockers football